Agnipankh (The Wings of Fire in Hindi) is a 2004 Indian film written and directed by Sanjiv Puri about pilots in the Indian Air Force. It is produced by Dhilin Mehta and Seema Kar under Shree Ashtavinayak Cine Vision Limited, and stars Jimmy Sheirgill, Sameer Dharmadhikari and Rahul Dev.

Synopsis 

The film opens with a tribute to Wg. Cdr Rakesh Rustogi and to the other martyrs of Indian Air Force. The scene then shifts to Air Force Station Srinagar in Jammu and Kashmir with Flying Officer Siddharth Singh (Jimmy Sheirgill), in his MiG-21 aircraft preparing for a Recce mission. The mission is successful but Siddharth gets hit by a SAM yet he manages to safely land his aircraft. Upon arriving back to Srinagar, he is confronted by his rival, colleague and another fighter pilot named Flying Officer Sameer Kelkar (Sameer Dharmadhikari). Siddharth's mother worries about his safety and confronts him regarding the hazards in his profession, but Siddharth brushes it off. He and his father later discuss the mission and the general atmosphere in Kashmir.

The scene later shifts to a golf match where two Senior Air Force Officers are discussing recent border violations and the Warlike state in Kashmir, however, this discussion gets overheard by a Pakistani spy who reports it to his superiors. The Pakistani Army deduces that the Indian Air Force plans to initiate its future course of action based on the information obtained from the Recce missions. Thus to gain further insight into the Indian planning, Pakistani army sends its most capable spy to infiltrate IAF's Srinagar Airbase. Here Flight Lieutenant Anjana "Anjie" Rawat (Shamita Shetty), a tomboyish chopper pilot is introduced. A soap opera motif is shown where Anjana loves Sameer but he does not reciprocate, but he has feelings for Surabhi, a wealthy socialite, who has feelings for Siddharth. At this juncture, Siddharth and Sameer's close friend Flight lieutenant Vishal Dev (Rahul Dev) is introduced. Vishal is newly posted to Srinagar, he arrives with his wife Nupur (Divya Dutta).

Meanwhile, the Pakistani spy gets employed at the Srinagar Air Base, from where he keeps sending critical information to his superiors in Pakistan. Sensing a sudden change in climate over LoC, IAF anticipates that Pakistan will launch its first attack aerially with Srinagar as its main target. The security around and in the base is tightened. IAF launches more recce missions to gain more intelligence. However, one such mission consisting of Vishal and Siddharth ends up in a failure with Vishal getting shot down over enemy territory and presumedly getting killed, thus resulting in Siddharth getting relieved of his flying status and being indefinitely grounded by the AOC. It is later revealed that Sameer had confided Siddharth's infidelities in Surabhi, making her break up with him, which ultimately led to Siddharth fumbling the mission. Sameer, feeling guilty confesses the truth about Siddharth to Surabhi, thus bringing Siddarth and Surabhi together.

Meanwhile, terrorists launch multiple attacks on the Air Base but are always thwarted. The Pakistani army deduces that for a successful aerial attack, the radar in Srinagar Air Base must be destroyed, hence the spy in the guise of a senior Air Force Officer allows several terrorists to infiltrate the Air Base's sensitive areas, but their plan is foiled by Siddharth and Sameer. Seeing their plans fail, Pakistan launches full-scale aerial attacks over eleven IAF bases, thus prompting the IAF to retaliate. Siddharth and Sameer, as a part of Special Mission, are sent to destroy a Pakistani ammo dump, which will disrupt supplies to Pakistani forces. In the mission, however, both Siddharth and Sameer are shot down by enemy aircraft during dogfight both of them ejected safely but are held captives in a Pakistani POW camp. In the POW Camp, Siddharth and Sameer are tortured regularly by Pakistani Army senior Officers for not giving them more information and placed with other Indian prisoners. However, Siddharth and Sameer manage to escape the Prison with the help of a 1971 war veteran Army Officer Lieutenant Sangram Singh Shekhawat (Kiran Kumar) of 6th Rajput Regiment. En route, they meet Vishal who was presumed dead, but in reality, was hiding from the Pakistani soldiers.

The prisoners then successfully contact Indian Army's 3rd Battalion The Grenadiers with the help of Radio stolen from enemy, but also invariably end up revealing their position to the Pakistani army, which launches a man-hunt to apprehend them. After learning about their existence they are alive the IAF with the help of Para Commnados of Indian Army launches a joint SAR mission inside the enemy territory. However, in the following firefight, while escape Vishal and the 1971 war veteran are killed, but Siddharth and Sameer are successfully rescued by Para Commnados and a squadron of Mi-17 chopper piloted by Anjana. the prisoners are brought home where they are Honoured and Felicitated by the Indian Government. The film ends with Siddharth and Sameer going to their next mission.

Cast
 Jimmy Sheirgill as Flying Officer Siddharth Singh (Sid/Sidey)
 Sameer Dharmadhikari as Flying Officer Sameer Kelkar (Sam/Sammy)
 Rahul Dev as Flight lieutenant Vishal Dev
 Shamita Shetty as Flight lieutenant Anjana Rawat/Anjana Sameer Kelkar
 Richa Pallod as Surbhi Dhar/Surbhi Siddharth Singh 
 Divya Dutta as Nupur Vishal Dev
 Kulbhushan Kharbanda as AVM Amod Mehta
 Kiran Kumar as Lieutenant Sangram Singh Shekhawat, 6th Rajput Regiment, war veteran
 Vrajesh Hirjee as Ittefaq
 Ashish Vidyarthi as Haider Baluchi, Pakistan Army Sniper
 Daya Shankar Pandey as Fateh Afghani, ISI Agent
 Shrivallabh Vyas as Firoze Ali Niyazi, Pakistan Army Officer 
 Akshay Anand as Flight lieutenant Charlie
 Anang Desai as Mr Singh, Siddarth Father
 Neelu Kohli as Mrs Singh, Siddarth Mother
 Vishwajeet Pradhan as Sq. Ldr. Sawant
 Benjamin Gilani as Group Captain Sehgal

Soundtrack

References
Indiafm.com Cast/Crew List
Indiafm.com Review
italkies.com

External links

2000s Hindi-language films
2004 films
Indian Air Force in films
Films featuring songs by Pritam